Rally Trophy is a 2001 historic PC rally simulation, developed by Bugbear Entertainment and published by JoWooD Productions for the Microsoft Windows operating system in 2001.

Reception

Rally Trophy received "favorable" reviews according to the review aggregation website Metacritic. The Finnish gaming magazine Pelit summarized that "Rally Trophy sets the standard for all future driving games. The graphics are absolutely stunning and the lack of inspiring game modes is compensated by the sheer thrill of driving cars that behave uniquely and realistically. A must-have for all rally fans".

IGN summarized that "Rally Trophy is a superb game that offers an unusual alternative to the more technology packed offerings like McRae and Pro Rally". Several critics compared the game to Grand Prix Legends including Pelit, IGN and GameSpot.

GameSpot presented Rally Trophy with its annual "Best Driving Game on PC" award. The game was a nominee for PC Gamer USs "2002 Best Racing Game" award, which ultimately went to NASCAR Racing 2002 Season.

The game sold over 650.000 copies.

References

External links
 
 
 

2001 video games
Cancelled Xbox games
Off-road racing video games
Rally racing video games
Video games developed in Finland
Video games scored by Jonne Valtonen
Video games set in Finland
Video games set in Kenya
Video games set in Russia
Video games set in Sweden
Video games set in Switzerland
Windows games
Windows-only games
JoWooD Entertainment games
Bugbear Entertainment games